Karl Gustaf Lennart Moberg (26 December 1918 – 5 February 1991) was a Swedish triple jumper. He competed at the 1948 Summer Olympics and 1950 European Athletics Championships and finished in 13th and 6th place, respectively.

Moberg held the Swedish triple jump title in 1948 and 1949. In 1948 he beat Arne Åhman, who became an Olympic champion later that year.

References

1918 births
1991 deaths
Swedish male triple jumpers
Olympic athletes of Sweden
Athletes (track and field) at the 1948 Summer Olympics
Sportspeople from Dalarna County